The Women's field hockey at the 2013 Australian Youth Olympic Festival was the third edition of the field hockey tournament for women at the AYOF.

Australia won the tournament for the first time by defeating China 2–1 in the final. Great Britain won the bronze medal by defeating the United States 2–1 in the third and fourth place playoff.

Teams

Results

Pool matches

Classification matches

Third and fourth place

Final

Statistics

Final standings

Goalscorers

References

External links

Field hockey at the Australian Youth Olympic Festival
International women's field hockey competitions hosted by Australia
2013 in women's field hockey
2013 in Australian women's field hockey